Manassas Park High School is a public high school in Manassas Park, Virginia. This school is part of Manassas Park City Schools and is at 8200 Euclid Avenue, Manassas Park, Virginia. The school has an enrollment of a little over 1100 students and serves all high school students living in Manassas Park.

History and Administration 
Manassas Park High School was built in 1999 and serves all students grades 9 through 12 in Manassas Park.

Administration 
The current principal of Manassas Park High School is Charles Forrest. Prior to being appointed principal, Forrest was an assistant principal at Manassas Park High School.

Accreditation 
Manassas Park High School, like all the other schools in Manassas Park, is fully accredited by the Virginia Department of Education.

Extracurriculars 
Manassas Park High School offers multiple extracurricular activities including Scholastic Bowl (academic team), Theatre, Student Council, and the Marching Cougars (Marching Band).

Athletics 
Manassas Park High School's mascot is a cougar and its sports teams currently play in the AA Northwestern District and AA Region II. Manassas Park offers competitive cheer, cross country, football, golf, indoor and outdoor track, girls' volleyball, basketball, wrestling, swimming, baseball, soccer, and softball.

References

External links 
 Manassas Park High School website
 Manassas Park High School Athletics

Public high schools in Virginia
1999 establishments in Virginia
Educational institutions established in 1999
Manassas Park, Virginia